The Tonga national under-23 football team, also known as Tonga U23, represents Tonga at U23 tournaments. The team is considered to be the feeder team for the Tonga national football team and is controlled by the Tonga Football Association.

History
Tonga U23 made three appearances so far at the OFC U23 Championship. They never reached further than the Group Stage. In 2019 they were defeated 4-1 by Fiji in their opening pool match before losing 8-0 to Vanuatu.

In 2012 Timote Moleni was appointed as team coach.

OFC 
The OFC Men's Olympic Qualifying Tournament is a tournament held once every four years to decide the only qualification spot for Oceania Football Confederation (OFC) and representatives at the Olympic Games.

Fixtures & Results

2019

Current squad
The following players were called to the squad for the 2019 OFC Men's Olympic Qualifying Tournament from 21 September - 5 October 2019.
Caps and goals updated as of 28 September 2019 after the match against .

2012 squad

Caps and goals as of 16 March 2012.

|-

! colspan="9"  style="background:#b0d3fb; text-align:left;"|
|- style="background:#dfedfd;"

|-

! colspan="9"  style="background:#b0d3fb; text-align:left;"|
|- style="background:#dfedfd;"

|-
! colspan="9"  style="background:#b0d3fb; text-align:left;"|
|- style="background:#dfedfd;"

List of coaches
  Timote Moleni (2012-2019)

See also
 Tonga national football team
 Tonga national under-20 football team
 OFC Men's Olympic Qualifying Tournament

References

Oceanian national under-23 association football teams
under-23